The 1941–42 Iowa State Cyclones men's basketball team represented Iowa State College in the 1941–42 college basketball season. The team was led by 14th-year head coach Louis Menze. In 1940–41, the Cyclones finished 15–4 overall (7–3 in the Big Six Conference). The team's captain was Al Budolfson.

Roster

Player stats 
Note: PPG = Points per Game

Schedule 

|-
!colspan=6 style=""|Regular Season

|-

References 
https://s3.amazonaws.com/sidearm.sites/isuni.sidearmsports.com/documents/2020/4/23/2020_21_Results2.pdf

Iowa State Cyclones men's basketball seasons
Iowa State